Vadym Melnyk (born 16 May 1980, Nemovychi, Ukraine) is a retired professional Ukrainian football defender who played for FC Desna Chernihiv.

Career

Veres Rivne
In 1997 he moved to Veres Rivne in Ukrainian Second League, where in the season 1997–98, he played 36 matches and scored 2 goals and got the 4th place in the league.

Borysfen Boryspil
In 1999 he moved to Borysfen Boryspil until 2005, where he played 184 matches and scored 33 goals and he won the Ukrainian Second League in the season 1999–2000.

Metalurh Donetsk
He was acquired from Metalurh Donetsk during the 2007–08 transfer season.

Desna Chernihiv
In 2012 he moved to Desna Chernihiv until 2018, where he become also the captain and he won Ukrainian Second League in the season 2012–13 and he got promoted in Ukrainian Premier League after the season 2017–18 in Ukrainian First League.

After Retirement
In 2020 he was appointed as Technical Sport Director of Desna Chernihiv. In 2020 he commented the chance for the club to be qualify for the in Europe League and the big result that the club gained after qualified for Ukrainian Premier League. In August 2021, Melnyk confirmed the that Yevhen Khacheridi, left Desna training camp after spending about three weeks in the location of the club of Chernihiv, with which he maintained training form, the parties did not come to a common denominator regarding the signing of the contract. Khacheridi left the training camp of Oleksandr Ryabokon's team on his own initiative. It is unknown whether the search for a new club will continue.

Honours
Desna Chernihiv
 Ukrainian First League: 2017–18
 Ukrainian Second League: 2012–13

Borysfen Boryspil
 Ukrainian Second League: 1999–2000

References

External links

Profile on Official Illychivets Website
Profile on Football Squads

1980 births
Living people
Ukrainian footballers
NK Veres Rivne players
FC Borysfen Boryspil players
FC Metalurh Donetsk players
SC Tavriya Simferopol players
FC Mariupol players
FC Bukovyna Chernivtsi players
FC Desna Chernihiv players
FC Desna Chernihiv captains
Ukrainian Premier League players
Association football defenders
Sportspeople from Rivne Oblast